Dashair Lake is located near the Rohtang Pass that connects Kullu district with Lahaul in the state of Himachal Pradesh, India.

References

External links
Himachal Pradesh Tourism Department

Lakes of Himachal Pradesh
Geography of Lahaul and Spiti district
Geography of Kullu district